Senator Calvo may refer to:

Eddie Baza Calvo (born 1961), Senate of Guam
Paul McDonald Calvo (born 1934), Senate of Guam